Adolphus Egerton Ryerson (24 March 1803 – 19 February 1882) was a Canadian educator, author, editor, and Methodist minister who was a prominent contributor to the design of the Canadian public school system. 

A renowned advocate against Christian sectarianism and control of Upper Canada by the wealthy Anglican elite, Ryerson staunchly opposed Clergy Reserves and promoted a system of free public education in Canada. Conversely, Ryerson was passionate about Christianization, favouring missionary work and protesting the removal of the Bible from Ontario schools. 

Following his time as a missionary to the Mississaugas of the Credit River, Ryerson became founding editor of The Christian Guardian, and the first principal of Victoria College. He was appointed as the first Chief Superintendent of Education for Upper Canada by Governor General Sir Charles Metcalfe in 1844, where he supported reforms such as creating school boards, making textbooks more uniform, and making education free. His extensive contributions to early education in Ontario led to him being memorialized with statues, and in the naming of several institutions and places in Ontario.

His 1847 Report On Industrial Schools to the government of Canada, and his writings on education, influenced the design and methods of the Canadian Indian residential school system. Now recognized as a form of cultural genocide, Ryerson's role in the design of the system has led to the removal of statues of him, sometimes by protesters. This has been followed by the removal of his name from institutions, parks and places. In April 2022, Ryerson University, on the site of his Normal School, was renamed to Toronto Metropolitan University as an act of reconciliation.

Early years

Ryerson was born on 24 March 1803 in Charlotteville Township, Upper Canada, to Joseph Ryerson (1761–1854), a United Empire Loyalist, a Lieutenant in the Prince of Wales' American Volunteers from Passaic County, New Jersey, and Sarah Mehetable Ryerson (née Stickney). He was one of six brothers – George, Samuel, William, John, and Edwy. Samuel was the only one of Egerton's brothers to not enter the Methodist ministry.

Methodist

He joined the Methodist Episcopal Church at 17, and was forced to leave home by his Anglican father. After leaving home, Ryerson worked as an usher in a London grammar school, before his father sent for him to return home. He did so and farmed for a small period of time before leaving again, this time to Hamilton to attend Gore District Grammar School. In Hamilton, he studied Latin and Greek with such fervour that he became ill with a fever that almost claimed his life. This enabled him to become a Methodist missionary or circuit rider. His first post was the York region surrounding Yonge Street. The circuit took four weeks to complete on foot or horseback, as it encompassed areas with roads in extremely poor condition. However, the experience gave Ryerson a first hand look at the life of the early pioneer.

In 1826, sermons from John Strachan, Anglican Archdeacon of York, Upper Canada, were published asserting that the Anglican church was, by law, the established church of Upper Canada. Methodists were singled out as American and therefore disloyal. Money was requested of the crown to allow the Anglican church to maintain ties to Great Britain. As Ryerson was the son of a Loyalist, this was an abomination. He emerged as Episcopal Methodism's most articulate defender in the public sphere by publishing articles (at first anonymously) and later books that argued against the views of Methodism's chief rival John Strachan and other members of the powerful Family Compact.

Ryerson was also elected (by one vote) to serve as the founding editor of Canadian Methodism's weekly denominational newspaper, the Christian Guardian, established in York, Upper Canada, in 1829 and which was also Canada's first religious newspaper. Ryerson used the paper to argue for the rights of Methodists in the province and, later, to help convince rank-and-file Methodists that a merger with British Wesleyans (effected in 1833) was in their best interest. Ryerson was castigated by the reformist press at that time for apparently abandoning the cause of reform and becoming, at least as far as they were concerned, a Tory. Ryerson resigned the editorship in 1835 only to assume it again at his brother John's urging from 1838 to 1840. In 1840 Ryerson allowed his name to stand for re-election one last time but was soundly defeated by a vote of 50 to 1.

Educator
In April 1831, Ryerson wrote in The Christian Guardian newspaper,

This quote is a fore-telling of Ryerson's contribution to education in Upper Canada.

In 1836, Ryerson visited England to secure the charter for Upper Canada Academy. This was the first charter ever granted by the British Government to a Nonconformist body for an educational institution. When it was incorporated in 1841 under the name Victoria College Ryerson assumed the presidency. Victoria College continues to exist as part of the University of Toronto. Ryerson also fought for many secularization reforms, to keep power and influence away from any one church, particularly the Church of England in Upper Canada which had pretensions to establishment. His advocacy of Methodism contributed to the eventual sale of the Clergy Reserveslarge tracts of land that had been set aside for the "maintenance of the Protestant clergy" under the Constitutional Act of 1791. "In honour of his achievements on behalf of the Methodist Church, Egerton Ryerson received a Doctor of Divinity degree from the Wesleyan University in Connecticut and served as President of the Church in Canada from 1874 to 1878."
 
Such secularization also led to the widening of the school system into public hands. Governor General Sir Charles Metcalfe asked him to become Chief Superintendent of Education for Upper Canada in 1844. It is in this role that Ryerson made his historical mark.

The Normal School at St. James Square was founded in Toronto in 1847, and became the province's foremost teacher's academy. It also housed the Department of Education as well as the Museum of Natural History and Fine Arts, which became the Royal Ontario Museum. The school operated by the Ontario Society of Artists at the Normal School would become the Ontario College of Art & Design. An agricultural laboratory on the site led to the later founding of the Ontario Agricultural College and the University of Guelph. St. James Square went through various other educational uses before it eventually became part of Ryerson University.

Ryerson University (later renamed Toronto Metropolitan University), Ryerson Press (McGraw-Hill Ryerson), and the Township of Ryerson in the Parry Sound District, Ontario, were named after him, as well as the small park, Ryerson Park, in the city of Owen Sound, at the northeast corner of 8th Street East and 5th Avenue East. There is also an intersection of two small streets in Toronto, Egerton Lane and Ryerson Avenue, between Spadina and Bathurst north of Queen Street West.

In 2017, the university was urged to change its name, amid growing acknowledgement of Ryerson's involvement in creating the Canadian Indian residential school system, which sought to integrate indigenous populations by eradicating their language and culture and by permanently separating children from their families. In April 2022, the university announced it would be renamed to Toronto Metropolitan University.

Legislation

Common School Act of 1846 
Ryerson's study of educational systems elsewhere in the Western world led to three school acts, which would revolutionize education in Canada. His major innovations included libraries in every school, an educational journal and professional development conventions for teachers, a central textbook press using Canadian authors, and securing land grants for universities.

The Common School Act of 1846, was an act that had established the First General School Board, where it would consist of Seven Members, that would each have their own responsibilities. Ryerson set the groundwork for compulsory education, which is what it has become today, he ensured that curriculums were made and that teaching and learning materials were provided and delivered to Schools, in the result of the best possible education. Ryerson did not believe that white and Aboriginal children should be taught in the same schools due to their different civilization and their upbringings.

Superintendent of Schools for Upper Canada 
Ryerson observed that previous educational legislation, most notably the Common School Act of 1843, was ineffective due to the limited powers of authority of the Superintendent of Schools. By comparing the office of the Superintendent to a corresponding office in New York State, namely the "State Superintendent", he noted that the 1843 Act allowed the Superintendent to draw up rules and responsibilities but no one was required to follow them. In his draft of the bill, he included several responsibilities of the Superintendent for Upper Canada: apportioning Legislature funds among the twenty district councils (in existence at that point in time), discouragement of unsuitable texts for classroom and school library usage (no common texts were the norm), provide direction for normal schools, prepare recommended plans for school houses and school libraries, dissemination of information, and annual reporting to the Governor General. This considerably expanded the role of Superintendent and placed significantly more responsibility upon the office.

Further, he established the first General Board of Education (the one established in 1823 was by order of the Lieutenant Governor not by legislation). The board consisted of the Superintendent and six other members nominated by the Governor General.

District superintendents
The bill provided provision for a new office, that of the District Superintendent. Ryerson recommended, although it did not become part of the legislation that followed from the 1846 bill, that as a savings measure the offices of Clerk of the District and District Superintendent be combined.

The District Superintendents became important civil servants, apportioning District School Funds in proportion of the number of students, teacher payment, visit all schools in their district; reporting on progress, advising teachers on school management, examining teachers' qualifications, revoking unqualified teachers, and preventing the use of unauthorized textbooks.

Common textbooks 
Ryerson advocated for uniform school textbooks across Upper Canada. Again, benchmarking the New York system, he noted that an Act passed in 1843 provided authority to the State Superintendent of Schools and county superintendents to reject any book in a school library. That system utilized University Regents to create a list of acceptable texts from which the schools purchased books. Ryerson did not propose absolute authority on book selection, rather, recommended that the Board of Education "make out a list of School Text Books, in each branch of learning that they would recommend, and another list they would not permit leaving Trustees to select from these lists."

Free schools
With the intent of providing education for all children, Ryerson began lobbying for the idea of free schools in 1846. His convictions on the matter were strengthened after studying systems of education in New York State and Massachusetts where financial provision for education was a cardinal one. Proving his point that education was a necessity, he was able to show, for example, in Toronto alone, less than half of the 4,450 children in the city were regular school attendees.

In his Circular to the County Municipalities, in 1846, he argued the following:

"The basis of this only true system of universal Education is two fold":

1. that every inhabitant of a Country is bound to contribute to the support of its Public Institutions, according to the property which he acquires, or enjoys, under the Government of the Country.

2. That every child born, or brought up in the Country, has a right to that education which will fit him for the duties of a useful citizen of the Country, and is not to be deprived of it, on account of the inability, or poverty, of his parents, or guardians."

Among other noble intentions, he was determined to provide education to those less privileged, as a means of improving the opportunities of all; or as he so eloquently described it as the "only effectual remedy for the pernicious and pauperizing system which is at present. Many children are now kept from school on the alleged grounds of parental poverty." 
Ryerson was persuasive in his arguments such that principle for free education, in a permission form, was embodied into the School Law of 1850. Subsequent debate followed until 1871 when free school provision was included in the Comprehensive School Act of 1871.

Common School Act of 1850 
The Common School Act updated 1847 legislation creating school boards across Canada West. It required that municipalities meet the funding needs stated by their local school board and allows for schools to be paid for through provincial and municipal funds alone, allowing individual boards to eliminate school fees but not making this compulsory. The Act also allowed for the creation of separate schools leading to provincially funded Catholic schools and to racially segregated schools.

The School Act of 1871 
The School Act made elementary education compulsory and free up to age 12. The Act also created two streams of secondary education: high schools, the lower stream, and collegiate institutes, the higher stream. Extra funding was provided for collegiate institutes "with a daily average attendance of sixty boys studying Latin and Greek under a minimum of four masters."

Ryerson and girls' education 
While Ryerson did not oppose female heads of household voting in school boards' elections, he did not support the education of women in general beyond the elementary level, due to a belief that their duty was to be wives and mothers. He ended co-educational instruction at the Upper Canada Academy and opposed the participation of girls at grammar schools in the province. He also insisted on the separation of boys and girls in common schools.

Ryerson and residential schools 

Egerton Ryerson is recognized as a key influence in the design of the Canadian Indian residential school system. His expert advice was sought by the Department of Indian Affairs of the Province of Canada, leading to an 1847 report. More than 50 years later (and 16 years after Ryerson died), Ryerson's recommendations for Aboriginal schools were appended to the first publication in 1898 of "Statistics Respecting Residential Schools" since the Indian Act (1876); "Agriculture being the chief interest, and probably the most suitable employment of the civilized Indians, I think the great object of industrial schools should be to fit the pupils for becoming working farmers and agricultural labourers, fortified of course by Christian principles, feelings and habits."

Ryerson's argument in 1847 that Indigenous peoples should be educated in separate boarding schools that were denominational, English-only and agriculturally/industrially oriented was the framework used in Canada's residential school system. Ryerson University's Aboriginal Education Council issued a statement regarding this involvement in 2010 calling for the university to acknowledge Ryerson's role in the conceptualization of residential schools and to create an environment welcoming to Aboriginal peoples as part of the truth and reconciliation process. Senator Murray Sinclair has declared that Ryerson University has shown leadership in its commitment to equity and diversity and is clearly dedicated to righting the wrongs of the past. Sinclair lauded the university for its response to the Truth and Reconciliation Commission's Calls to Action.

On June 25, 2018, there was an official installation of a plaque that contextualizes and acknowledges Egerton Ryerson's involvement in the history of residential schools beside the statue of his likeness on Ryerson University campus. The plaque contains the following text:

Beneath this text are the following two quotations:

On July 18, 2020, three people were arrested for splattering pink paint on the Egerton Ryerson statue – in addition to two others of John A. Macdonald and King Edward VII at the Ontario Legislature – as part of a demand to tear down the monuments. Black Lives Matter Toronto claimed responsibility for the actions stating that "The action comes after the City of Toronto and the Province of Ontario have failed to take action against police violence against Black people." Three people were each charged with three counts of mischief under $5,000 and conspiracy to commit a summary offence; the charges were dropped the following year.

On June 1, 2021, following the discovery of soil disturbances at the Kamloops Indian Residential School, widely reported by the media as sites of 215 unmarked graves, the statue was vandalized again, this time with red paint. On June 6, the statue was toppled, decapitated and thrown into Toronto Harbour; Ryerson University stated that the statue will not be restored or replaced. The head of the statue was subsequently placed on a pike at the Six Nations of the Grand River near Caledonia, Ontario.

On June 8, 2021, the town of Owen Sound, Ontario removed the name plaque of Ryerson Park. The park, named for Egerton Ryerson, will be renamed at the request of 1,000 residents of Owen Sound. The town pre-emptively removed the plaque to prevent its defacement and damage. A school named for Ryerson in Owen Sound was closed in 1990.

On April 26, 2022, Ryerson University announced it would be renamed to Toronto Metropolitan University.

Personal life
Ryerson was married twice and had several children. In 1828, he married Hannah Aikman. She died in 1832, soon after the birth of their second child. Their children were John and Lucilla Hannah. John died of dysentery in 1835 at age six, and Lucilla died of consumption (tuberculosis) in 1849 at age 17. 

In 1833, Ryerson married Mary Armstrong in York (Toronto). Together they had two children, Sophia in 1836 and Charles Egerton in 1847:
 Charles Egerton Ryerson (1847–1909) – secretary-treasurer and assistant librarian of Toronto; his children with Emily Eliza Beatty (1848–1947) were:
 Egerton Ryerson (1876–?), a missionary priest in Japan
 Edward Stanley Ryerson (1879–1963)
 Stanley Bréhaut Ryerson (1911–1998), historian and Communist politician
 Mary Ella Ryerson (1882–1983)
 Isabel Louise Ryerson (1884–1954)
 John Egerton Ryerson (1887–1916)
Sophia Ryerson Harris (1836–1898)

Ryerson retired in 1876. His book The Loyalists of America and Their Times on the United Empire Loyalists was published in 1881. He died on 19 February 1882 after an extended illness. Schools were closed and flags at half-staff in his honour. His funeral was held at the Metropolitan Wesleyan Methodist Church, attended by the Lieutenant-Governor of Ontario John Beverley Robinson, members of the Legislative Assembly of Ontario, officials of the Methodist Church and officials of Victoria College. He was buried in Mount Pleasant Cemetery, Toronto.

References

Further reading
 French, Goldwin. Parsons & Politics. Toronto: Ryerson Press, 1962.
 McLaren, Scott. Pulpit, Press, and Politics: Methodists and the Market for Books in Upper Canada. University of Toronto Press, 2019.
 Thomas, Clara. Ryerson of Upper Canada. Toronto: Ryerson Press, 1969.
 Westfall, William. Two Worlds: The Protestant Culture of Nineteenth Century Ontario. Kingston: McGill-Queen's UP, 1989.
 Brown, Jennifer S. H. (ed.), Elizabeth Bingham Young, E. Ryerson Young. "Mission Life in Cree-Ojibwe Country: Memories of a Mother and Son." Edmonton: Athabasca University Press, 2014.
 Nixon, Virginia (2006). "EGERTON RYERSON AND THE OLD MASTER COPY AS AN INSTRUMENT OF PUBLIC EDUCATION". Journal of Canadian Art History. 27: 94–113 – via JSTOR.
 Archives, Ryerson University. "Egerton Ryerson, 1803-1882". Ryerson University.
 Pearce, Colin (December 1988). "Canadian Journal of Political Science". 21 (4): 771–793.
 Semple, Neil. "Egerton Ryerson".
 Putnam, John Harold. Egerton Ryerson and Education in Upper Canada.
 Ryerson University's Aboriginal Education Council (August 2010). "Egerton Ryerson, The Residential School System and Truth and Reconciliation" (PDF). Ryerson.
 Nicolson, Joanne. "1871 Education Act". Radical Reform. Toronto District School Board.
 Sissons, C.B. Egerton Ryerson: His Life and Letters. Clarke, Irwin and Company, Ltd. 1947.

External links

 
 Early standard biography by Nathanael Burwash
 Ryerson's autobiography edited by George Hodgins
 Conservation Treatment of Portrait of Egerton Ryerson

Selected works available online
 
 
 Dr. Ryerson's Reply to the Recent Pamphlet of Mr. Langton & Dr. Wilson on the University Question. Guardian Office, 1861.
 Copies of Correspondence between the Chief Superintendent of Schools for Upper Canada, and other persons, on the question of Separate Schools. Toronto: Lovell & Gibson, 1855.
 Ryerson University's Aboriginal Education Council. Egerton Ryerson, the Residential School System and Truth and Reconciliation. August, 2010.

Primary sources
 
 Sissons, C.B., ed. My Dearest Sophie: Letters of Egerton Ryerson to His Daughter. Toronto: Ryerson Press, 1955.
 Ryerson, Egerton; Canada. Dept. of Indian Affairs. Statistics respecting Indian schools with Dr. Ryerson's report of 1847 attached. Ottawa: Government Print. Bureau, 1898.

1803 births
1882 deaths
19th-century Methodist ministers
Canadian educators
Canadian Methodist ministers
Canadian people of Dutch descent
Canadian university and college chief executives
Converts to Methodism from Anglicanism
Education in Ontario
Methodist circuit riders
People from Norfolk County, Ontario
Persons of National Historic Significance (Canada)
Pre-Confederation Ontario people
Toronto Metropolitan University
Wesleyan University people
Burials at Mount Pleasant Cemetery, Toronto